Gabriel Montilla (born 11 August 1979) is a Puerto Rican former professional tennis player.

Before competing on the professional tour, Montilla played collegiate tennis for the Indiana Hoosiers. 

Montilla is Puerto Rico's most successful Davis Cup player in history, with 38 overall wins, 21 in singles and 17 in doubles. His Davis Cup career, which included 33 ties, was played from 1999 to 2006, before a final comeback appearance in 2015.

At the 2002 Central American and Caribbean Games, Montilla was a mixed doubles gold medalist partnering Kristina Brandi. They won the final against the Mexican pairing of Santiago González and Melissa Torres Sandoval.

Montilla represented Puerto Rico at the 2003 Pan American Games in Santo Domingo and was eliminated from the singles draw in unusual circumstances. After winning his first two matches, he was due to meet Brazil's Fernando Meligeni in the third round, but didn't arrive to court on time and was defaulted. He had mistakingly thought the match was scheduled for the following day.

References

External links
 
 
 

1979 births
Living people
Puerto Rican male tennis players
Indiana Hoosiers men's tennis players
Competitors at the 2002 Central American and Caribbean Games
Central American and Caribbean Games medalists in tennis
Central American and Caribbean Games gold medalists for Puerto Rico
Tennis players at the 2003 Pan American Games
Pan American Games competitors for Puerto Rico